Conrad Meyer may refer to:
 Conrad Meyer (painter) (1618–1689)
 Conrad Ferdinand Meyer (1825–1898), Swiss poet
 Conrad Meyer (bishop) (1922–2011), British religious leader